Inagayuk Joseph Quqqiaq is a Canadian Inuk politician, who was elected to the Legislative Assembly of Nunavut in the 2021 Nunavut general election. He represents the electoral district of Netsilik.

References

Living people
Members of the Legislative Assembly of Nunavut
Inuit politicians
21st-century Canadian politicians
Inuit from Nunavut
People from Taloyoak
Year of birth missing (living people)